Beechmont may refer to several places:

Beechmont, Queensland in Australia
Beechmont, Nova Scotia in Canada
United States
Beechmont, Louisville in Kentucky
Beechmont, Muhlenberg County, Kentucky
Beechmont, New York (also known as Beechmont Knolls and Beechmont Woods) in New Rochelle
Beechmont Country Club in Orange, Ohio